Gareth Andrew Carrivick (16 November 1957 – 16 March 2010) was a British director who was known for his involvement in productions such as FAQ About Time Travel and The Big Impression. He died of leukemia in 2010.

Filmography

Film

Television

References

1957 births
2010 deaths
Deaths from leukemia
British directors